Samuel Scott may refer to:

 Samuel Scott (painter) (1702–1772), British painter known for his seascapes
 Samuel Scott, 2nd Baronet of Lytchet Minster (1772–1849) Member of Parliament for Malmesbury 1802–1806, and Camelford 1812–1818, and Whitchurch  1818–1832
 Samuel Gilbert Scott (c. 1813–1841), American daredevil
 Samuel J. Scott (1938–2021), American engineer
 Samuel Parsons Scott (1846–1929), attorney, banker, and scholar
 Sir Samuel Scott, 6th Baronet (1873–1943), British Conservative Party politician, Member of Parliament 1898–1922
 Sir Samuel Haslam Scott (1875–1960), businessman, author and philanthropist
 Samuel Fischer Scott (1907–1988), university director
 Samuel Flynn Scott (born 1978), musician
 Samuel Scott (footballer) (1873–1938), Scottish footballer
 Sam Scott (born 1990), British rugby league player
 S. H. Scott, a lawyer and state legislator in Arkansas